Unwin Ledge is a flat-topped ridge or tableland, located to the west of the Hothem Cliffs and  south of Mount Hall in the Asgard Range of Victoria Land, Antarctica. It was named by the New Zealand Geographic Board (NZGB) in 1998 for R.S. Unwin, former superintendent of the New Zealand DSIR Geophysical Observatory, who was active in research at Scott Base from 1958 to 1959.

Ridges of Victoria Land
Scott Coast